Forte (foaled February 3, 2020) is a Champion American Thoroughbred racehorse who won the Grade I Hopeful Stakes, Breeders' Futurity at Keeneland and Breeders' Cup Juvenile which was held at Keeneland as a two-year-old.

Background
Forte is a dark bay or brown colt that was bred in Kentucky by South Gate Farm. He was sired by Violence, winner of the 2012 Grade I CashCall Futurity at Hollywood Park. Forte is from the sixth Northern Hemisphere crop sired by Violence and is his 28th stakes winner, and follows Dr. Schivel, No Parole, and Volatile as his fourth Grade 1 winner. Violence stands at Hill 'n' Dale Farms for $25,000 in 2022.

Forte is out of the Blame mare Queen Caroline, winner of four black-type events on the turf, including the 2016 Indiana Grand Stakes with $401,608 stakes earned in a 20 race career. She is out of a daughter of Forestry, Queens Plaza, winner of the 2004 Sorority Stakes at Monmouth Park. Fourth dam Jeano is out of the 1985 Grade 1 Delaware Handicap winner Basie, whose dam, Stolen Base, also appears as third dam of Champion Smarty Jones. Stolen Base is from a branch of the La Troienne family.  
Forte was sold originally as a weanling for $80,000 at the 2020 Keeneland November Sale to Silver Hill Farm. Later Forte was sold for $110,000 from the Eaton Sales consignment at the 2021 Keeneland September Yearling Sale to Mike Repole's Repole Stable and Vincent Viola of St. Elias Stable. Forte is trained by U.S. Racing Hall of Fame trainer Todd Pletcher.

Racing career

2022: two-year-old season
Forte began his career on May 27 at Belmont Park in a Maiden Special Weight event for two-year-olds over a distance of five furlongs in small field of 5 of which four were first-starters. Forte started as the 1/5 odds-on favorite settled from start chasing the leaders Wasabi Boy and Gotta Like Him. Jockey Irad Ortiz Jr. moved Forte inside into the two path early on the turn then angling four wide at the five-sixteenths marker. He moved to the lead in the upper stretch then moved in some while passing Wasabi Boy, powering away under strong urging to win easily by  lengths in 58.21 seconds.

Forte's next start was on July 16 in the Grade III Sanford Stakes at Saratoga Race Course over a distance of six furlongs. The event attracted twelve starters of which eleven had won their last start with Forte starting the 7/5 favorite.Forte settled off the pace, was roused three wide on the turn and into upper stretch under a drive by Irad Ortiz Jr. and lacked the needed response and finished fourth to Mo Strike beaten by nearly six lengths.  

Undeterred by Forte's performance connections started him in the Grade I Hopeful Stakes at Saratoga on Labor Day weekend. On a rainy day which created a sloppy track Forte started at 13/2 fourth choice and was unhurried early as Gulfport and Mo Strike pushed the lead. Approaching the eighth pole, Forte grabbed the lead and then pulled away winning by three lengths to cover the seven furlongs in 1:22.58.

Connections opted to pass the Grade I Champagne Stakes for the Grade I Breeders' Futurity at Keeneland which was scheduled a week later. Again Forte was unhurried in the early stages settling in seventh place in a field of fourteen behind the 3/2 favorite Loggins. Forte was forced to tip four-wide on the turn moving into contention at the quarter pole. Forte moved his head in front of Loggins with two furlongs left to run and the colts battled the entire length of the stretch. At the wire, Forte was the narrow victor in a time of 1:44.74 on a fast main track. Both runners made contact down the stretch with the winner placing the runner-up in tight quarters with about a sixteenth of a mile remaining. A long inquiry ensued, though the stewards ultimately made no change to the order of finish. By winning the Breeders' Futurity, Forte qualified to the Breeders' Cup since the event is a "Win and You're In" race for the GI Breeders' Cup Juvenile.

2023: three-year-old season

Forte first start as a three-year-old was in the Grade II Fountain of Youth Stakes at Gulfstream Park. Starting as the 1/2 odds-on favorite Forte impressively won the event by  lengths in a winning time of 1:43.12 for the  miles contest. Forte solidified his place in the Road to the Kentucky Derby with an additional 50 qualification points and confirmed his early favoritism for the main event.

Statistics

Notes:

An (*) asterisk after the odds means Forte was the post-time favourite.

Pedigree

Forte is inbred 4s × 4d to Storm Cat, meaning Storm Cat appears twice in the fourth generation, once the sire’s side and once on dam's side of the pedigree.

References

2020 racehorse births
Racehorses bred in Kentucky
Racehorses trained in the United States
Thoroughbred family 1-x
American Grade 1 Stakes winners
Breeders' Cup Juvenile winners